Kalamboli is a railway station on the Vasai Road–Diva–Panvel–Roha route of the Central Line, of the Mumbai Suburban Railway network.

References

Railway stations in Raigad district
Mumbai Suburban Railway stations
Mumbai CR railway division
Diva-Panvel rail line